is a former Japanese football player who played as a midfielder. He was called Samurai Matsunaga by his fans because of his samurai-like playing spirit.

References

External links

Shohei Matsunaga at Liga Indonesia.co.id

1989 births
Living people
Kokushikan University alumni
Association football people from Shizuoka Prefecture
Japanese footballers
J2 League players
Liga 1 (Indonesia) players
FC Schalke 04 II players
Ehime FC players
Persib Bandung players
Persiba Balikpapan players
Gresik United players
Japanese expatriate footballers
Expatriate footballers in Germany
Japanese expatriate sportspeople in Germany
Expatriate footballers in Indonesia
Association football midfielders